Highland Park Presbyterian Church could mean:
Highland Park Presbyterian Church located in Michigan.
Highland Park Presbyterian Church located in Illinois.
Highland Park Presbyterian Church located in Dallas, Texas.